Anne Baldwin Gust Brown (born March 15, 1958) is an American business executive who was the First Lady of California from 2011 to 2019. She is married to former Governor Jerry Brown.

Her career positions include executive vice president for the clothing retailer The Gap and a director of the fast food chain, Jack in the Box, Inc.

Early life and education
Gust was born on March 15, 1958, in Bloomfield Hills, Michigan, to Rockwell T. "Rocky" Gust, Jr. and Anne Baldwin Gust. She graduated at the top of her class in high school, and attended Stanford University, where she graduated with a degree in political science. After graduation, she returned to Michigan to attend the University of Michigan Law School.

Career
After becoming a lawyer, Gust joined clothing retailer Gap Inc. in 1991.   She was senior vice president and general counsel from 1994 to 1998, executive vice president of human resources, legal and corporate administration from 1998 to 1999, executive vice president of human resources, legal, global compliance and corporate administration of Gap Inc. from 1999 to 2000, chief compliance officer from 1998 to May 13, 2005, and chief administrative officer and executive vice president from March 2000 to May 13, 2005.

Gust served as a director of Jack in the Box Inc. from January 1, 2003, to February 10, 2010.

Personal life
Gust met Jerry Brown in 1990 at a party, while he was serving as the chairman of the California Democratic Party. She married him in 2005. Gust has been noted for her political influence on the Governor during his time in office.

References

 

1958 births
Living people
First Ladies and Gentlemen of California
American women lawyers
American lawyers
California Democrats
Lawyers from San Francisco
People from Bloomfield Hills, Michigan
Stanford University alumni
University of Michigan Law School alumni
Jerry Brown
21st-century American women